Anstey may refer to:

People
Anstey (surname)

Places

Australia
Anstey railway station, on the Upfield railway line, Melbourne, Victoria
Anstey Hill Recreation Park, a public park in Adelaide, South Australia

Canada
Anstey River, British Columbia
Anstey's Cove, a hamlet near Little Bay Islands, Newfoundland and Labrador

England

Settlements
Anstey, Leicestershire
East Anstey and West Anstey, villages in Devon
Anstey Heights, part of Beaumont Leys, Leicester
East Anstey and West Anstey, villages in Devon

Other places in England
Anstey Castle, the remains of a 12th-century castle in Anstey, Hertfordshire
Anstey College of Physical Education, Birmingham
Anstey Nomads F.C., a football club based in Anstey, Leicestershire

South Africa
Ansteys Building, an art deco building in Johannesburg

See also
Anstey case (1158–1163), a legal dispute between Richard of Anstey and Mabel de Francheville
Ansty (disambiguation)